Prague 8 is a municipal district (městská část) in Prague, Czech Republic.

The administrative district (správní obvod) of the same name consists of municipal districts Prague 8, Březiněves, Ďáblice and Dolní Chabry.

See also
Districts of Prague#Symbols

External links 
 Prague 8 - Official homepage

 
Districts of Prague